Perivolaki is a village and a community of the Lagkadas municipality. Before the 2011 local government reform it was part of the municipality of Lagkadas, of which it was a municipal district. The 2011 census recorded 1,160 inhabitants in the village. The community of Perivolaki covers an area of 7.625 km2.

See also
List of settlements in the Thessaloniki regional unit

References

Populated places in Thessaloniki (regional unit)